William David Hill (October 1, 1833 – December 26, 1906) was a U.S. Representative from Ohio.

Early life and career 
Born in Nelson County, Virginia, Hill attended the country schools and Antioch College.
He moved to Springfield, Ohio, and published the Ohio Press in 1858.
He studied law.
He was admitted to the bar in 1859 and commenced practice in Springfield, Ohio.
He served as mayor of Springfield 1861-1863.
He served as member of the State house of representatives 1866-1870.
He served as member of the Board of Education of Defiance, Ohio.
Superintendent of insurance 1875-1878.
He served as delegate to the Democratic National Convention in 1880 and 1888.

Congress 
Hill was elected as a Democrat to the Forty-sixth Congress (March 4, 1879 – March 3, 1881).

Hill was elected to the Forty-eighth and Forty-ninth Congresses (March 4, 1883 – March 3, 1887).
He served as chairman of the Committee on Territories (Forty-ninth Congress).
He was an unsuccessful candidate for reelection in 1886 to the Fiftieth Congress.

Later career and death 
He resumed the practice of law in Defiance, Ohio.
He moved to Kalispell, Montana, in 1891.
He returned to Defiance in 1896 and continued the practice of law.
City solicitor of Defiance 1903-1905.

Death
He died near Litchfield, Illinois, while en route to Los Angeles, California, December 26, 1906.
He was interred in Riverside Cemetery, Defiance, Ohio.

Hill was married June 3, 1862, to Augusta B. March, and had four daughters.

References

Sources

1833 births
1906 deaths
People from Defiance, Ohio
Mayors of places in Ohio
Antioch College alumni
19th-century American newspaper publishers (people)
Democratic Party members of the Ohio House of Representatives
Ohio lawyers
Democratic Party members of the United States House of Representatives from Ohio
19th-century American politicians
Journalists from Ohio
People from Nelson County, Virginia